Renate Lingor (born 11 October 1975) is a retired female German international footballer, who played as a midfielder or forward.

Club career
Lingor began her career in 1981 with SV Blankenloch at the age of six, in 1983 she joined the youth team of Karlsruher SC. Aged 14 she signed with SC Klinge Seckach where she started her professional career in German Bundesliga. Despite several offers from top German teams she remained there until 1997 when she joined 1. FFC Frankfurt. Lingor's position is in the central midfield. She is well known for her good technique, her ability to read a game and her free kicks. She has retired after the 2007–08 season.

International career
Before her first appearance in the German national team in 1995 Lingor made 19 games for the Under 20 Team. Since then she has been constantly part of the team that won several international titles. Her goal against Sweden at the 2004 Olympics secured the bronze medal for her team. In 2006 Renate Lingor was nominated as FIFA Women's World Player of the Year together with Marta and Kristine Lilly (USA). Lingor announced, that she would retire after the 2008 Olympic Games.

Style of play
Lingor usually played in the number 10 role in midfield behind the forwards, although she was also used in a more attacking role on occasion, or even in a deeper role in front of the defence. In 2007, a FIFA.com profile described her with the following words: "She moves around the pitch with lithe elegance, is technically brilliant and has excellent vision. She can dummy and feint past almost anyone and is lethal from set pieces – so much so that she is often compared in her homeland with top playmakers from the men's game like Mehmet Scholl and Thomas Hassler. And with good reason. Lingor, who stands 1.66m (5'5") tall, is as consistently exceptional as her now retired male counterparts." The profile also praised her for creativity and playmaking skills, lauding her as a "master of the defence-splitting pass," while also noting her work-rate, stating: "Lingor is not only a creative outlet just behind the front two but also capable of working in front of the defence to break up opposition play and then launch lightning-quick counter-attacks."

Career statistics

Clubs 
 FFC Frankfurt
 SC Klinge-Seckach
 DFC Eggenstein
 Karlsruher SC
 SV Blankenloch.

Honours
1. FFC Frankfurt
 UEFA Women's Champions League: Winner 2002, 2006, 2008
 Bundesliga: Winner 1999, 2001, 2002, 2003, 2005, 2007, 2008
 DFB-Pokal: Winner 1999, 2000, 2001, 2002, 2003, 2007, 2008
 DFB-Hallenpokal for women: Winner 1997, 1998, 1999, 2002, 2006, 2007

Germany
 FIFA Women's World Cup: Winner 2003, 2007
 UEFA Women's Championship: Winner 1997, 2001,  2005
 Football at the Summer Olympics: Bronze medal 2000, 2004, 2008

Individual
 2007 FIFA Women's World Cup All star team

References

1975 births
Living people
German women's footballers
Germany women's international footballers
1999 FIFA Women's World Cup players
2003 FIFA Women's World Cup players
2007 FIFA Women's World Cup players
Footballers at the 1996 Summer Olympics
Footballers at the 2000 Summer Olympics
Footballers at the 2004 Summer Olympics
Footballers at the 2008 Summer Olympics
Olympic bronze medalists for Germany
Olympic footballers of Germany
1. FFC Frankfurt players
FIFA Century Club
Footballers from Karlsruhe
Olympic medalists in football
Medalists at the 2008 Summer Olympics
Medalists at the 2004 Summer Olympics
FIFA Women's World Cup-winning players
Medalists at the 2000 Summer Olympics
UEFA Women's Championship-winning players
Women's association football midfielders
Women's association football forwards